Sphenomorphus aignanus  is a species of skink found in Papua New Guinea.

References

aignanus
Reptiles described in 1898
Taxa named by George Albert Boulenger
Skinks of New Guinea